Jason Koster (born 11 March 1983) is a New Zealand judoka. He competed in the Men's −100 kg event at the 2014 Commonwealth Games where he won a bronze medal.

References

External links
 
 Jason Koster at The-Sports.org

1983 births
Living people
New Zealand male judoka
Commonwealth Games bronze medallists for New Zealand
Judoka at the 2014 Commonwealth Games
Commonwealth Games medallists in judo
20th-century New Zealand people
21st-century New Zealand people
Medallists at the 2014 Commonwealth Games